Bangabandhu Sheikh Mujibur Rahman Digital University is a Bangladesh's first specialized Government digital university. It was established in 2018. It is situated in Kaliakair, Gazipur, Dhaka.

History 
On 26 July 2016, the Government of the People's Republic of Bangladesh enacted a regulation withinside the National Assembly to set up this varsity on a 50-acre web website online adjoining to Bangabandhu Hi-Tech Park in Kaliakair, Gazipur District. In the 2018-2019 educational 12 months, university began its educational sports from March 2019. The University Grants Commission (Bangladesh) has already given the approval to behavior instructional sports beneath neath schools specifically the Faculty of Engineering and the Faculty of Educational Research and the Institute for Online and Distance Learning.

Academic

Faculties 
Faculty of Engineering
Department of Information and Communications Technology
 Bachelor of Science in Internet of Thing (IOT)
Faculty of Education and Research

 Department of Education
 Bachelor of Science in ICT in Education (ICTE)

Institute 
Institute for Online and Distance Learning
 Certificate Course on "Digital Learning Design"
 Certificate Course on "Digital Content Development"
 Certificate Course on "Mobile Application Development "
 Certificate Course in "Cyber ​​Security"

See Also 

 List of universities in Bangladesh
 Bangabandhu Sheikh Mujibur Rahman Maritime University
 Bangabandhu Sheikh Mujibur Rahman Aviation and Aerospace University

References 

Public universities of Bangladesh